Zakharu-e Bala (also Romanized as Zākhrū-e Bālā; also known as Zākhrūyeh and Zākhrūyeh-ye ‘Olyā) is a village in Zakharuiyeh Rural District, Efzar District, Qir and Karzin County, Fars Province, Iran. At the 2006 census, its population was 226, in 50 families.

References 

Populated places in Qir and Karzin County